Berthaville is an unincorporated community in King George County, Virginia, United States. Berthaville developed as an agricultural community in the nineteenth century at the crossroads of Caledon Road (VA 218), Dahlgren Road (VA 206/VA 218), and Saint Paul's Road (VA Secondary 655).

Unincorporated communities in King George County, Virginia
Unincorporated communities in Virginia
Northern Neck